Nationality words link to articles with information on the nation's poetry or literature (for instance, Irish or France).

Events
 William Butler Yeats founds the National Literary Society in Dublin.

Works published

Australia

United Kingdom
 A. C. Benson, Le Cahier Jaune
 Wilfred Seawen Blunt, Esther, Love Lyrics, and Natalia's
 Austin Dobson, The Ballad of Beau Brocade, and Other Poems of the XVIIIth Century
 Rudyard Kipling, Barrack-Room Ballads, and Other Verses, including "Gunga Din," "Danny Deever", "Fuzzy-Wuzzy", "Mandalay" and "Gentlemen-Rankers", first book publication, Methuen (see also Barrack-Room Balads, second series in 1896)
 Richard Le Gallienne, English Poems
 George Meredith:
 Modern Love: Aa Reprint (see Modern Love, 1862)
 Poems
 Arthur Symons, Silhouettes
 Alfred Tennyson:
 The Silent Voices
 The Death of Oenone, Akbar's Dream, and Other Poems
 William Watson, Lachrymae Musarum, and Other Poems, about the death of Tennyson
 W. B. Yeats, The Countess Kathleen and Various Legends and Lyrics, including "The Lake Isle of Innisfree" (a poem first published in 1890) and the first version of the verse drama The Countess Cathleen, Irish poet published in the United Kingdom

United States
 Ambrose Bierce, Black Beetles in Amber, verse, nonfiction and drama
 James Whitcomb Riley, Green Fields and Running Brooks
 Walt Whitman, Leaves of Grass, ninth edition

Other in English
 Frederick George Scott, Elton Hazlewood, Canada

Works published in other languages

France
 Théodore de Banville, Dans la fournaise
 Paul Claudel, La Ville, France
 Francis Jammes, Vers, (also 1893 and 1894)
 Stéphane Mallarmé, Vers et prose
 Catulle Mendès, Les Poesies de Catulle Mendes, in three volumes
 François Villon, first publication of Poems 7–11 of his "Ballades en jargon" in Oeuvres complëtes de François Villon, publiès díaprës les manuscrits et les plus anciennes Èditions, edited by Auguste Longnon, Paris: Lemerre, (Poems 1–6 were first published in 1489), posthumous

Other languages
 Stefan George, Algabal, illustrated by Melchior Lechter; limited, private edition; German
 Verner von Heidenstam, Hans Alienus, Swedish

Awards and honours

Births
Death years link to the corresponding "[year] in poetry" article:
 January 3 – J. R. R. Tolkien (died 1973), South African-born English fantasy novelist, poet, philologist and academic
 January 8 – Horiguchi Daigaku 堀口 大学 (died 1981), Japanese, Taishō and Shōwa period poet and translator of French literature; member of the Shinshisha ("The New Poetry Society"); accompanies his father on overseas diplomatic postings (surname: Horiguchi)
 January 30 – Caresse Crosby (died 1970), American poet, publisher, peace activist, socialite and patentee of a bra
 January 31 – Ozaki Kihachi 尾崎喜八 (died 1974), Japanese, Shōwa period poet (surname: Ozaki)
 February 8 – Ralph Chubb (died 1960), English poet, printer and artist
 February 22 – Edna St. Vincent Millay (died 1950), American poet and playwright
 March 8 – Juana de Ibarbourou (died 1979), Uruguayan poet
 March 9 – Vita Sackville-West (died 1962), English novelist, poet and gardener
 March 16 – César Vallejo (died 1938), Peruvian poet
 May 7 – Archibald MacLeish (died 1982), American poet, writer and the Librarian of Congress
 May 17 – Leon Gellert (died 1977), Australian poet
 May 26 – Maxwell Bodenheim (murdered 1954), American poet and novelist
 June 12 – Djuna Barnes (died 1982), American writer and poet
 July 8 – Richard Aldington (died 1962), English poet, novelist, writer, translator and biographer
 August 11 – Hugh MacDiarmid, pen name of Christopher Murray Grieve (died 1978), Scottish poet and nationalist
 October 8 (September 26 O.S.) – Marina Tsvetaeva (suicide 1941), Russian poet
 November 12 – Guo Moruo 郭沫若 (died 1978), Chinese archaeologist, historian, poet, politician and writer
 December 21 – Amy Clarke (died 1980), English mystical poet, writer and teacher

Deaths

Birth years link to the corresponding "[year] in poetry" article:
 March 26 – Walt Whitman (born 1819), American poet and journalist
 May 2 – Barcroft Boake (born 1866), Australian poet and boundary rider, probable suicide
 May 30/31 – Mary H. Gray Clarke (born 1835), American poet, author, correspondent
 July 15 – Thomas Cooper (born 1805), English Chartist, poet and religious lecturer
 September 7 – John Greenleaf Whittier (born 1807), American poet
 October 6 – Alfred, Lord Tennyson (born 1809), English Poet Laureate of the United Kingdom
 October 7 – Thomas Woolner (born 1825), English sculptor and poet
 December 1 – Carlo Favetti (born 1819), Friulian politician and poet
 December 3 (November 21 O.S.) – Afanasy Fet (born 1820), Russian lyric poet, essayist and short-story writer

See also

 19th century in poetry
 19th century in literature
 List of years in poetry
 List of years in literature
 Victorian literature
 French literature of the 19th century
 Symbolist poetry
 Young Poland (Młoda Polska) a modernist period in Polish  arts and literature, roughly from 1890 to 1918
 Poetry

Notes

19th-century poetry
Poetry